Portland Rain was an American women's soccer team based in Portland, Oregon. The team is a member of the Women's Premier Soccer League, the third tier of women's soccer in the United States and Canada. The team plays in the North Division of the Pacific Conference, with home games throughout the Portland area.

The team was founded in 2000 and dominated the Pacific Coast Soccer League (PCSL) in its first year. In 2001 the team was a provisional member of the USL W-League. The team played 2002 and 2003 in the PCSL.

The Rain, reestablished in 2008, played a 10-match schedule in the WPSL from May to July. Management and day-to-day operation of the Rain during the 2012 season were a joint effort between the Portland Timbers and Rain personnel. For the 2013 season the Portland Timbers were awarded a franchise in the USSF Division 1 National Women's Soccer League named the Portland Thorns FC.

Players

Current roster
Stacy Ermini

Notable former players

Year-by-year

Honors

Competition history

Coaches
Monty Hawkins (2000)

General Manager - Mike Smith

Head Coach - Janine Szpara

Assistant Coach - Rochelle Hearns

Stadium
2012 home games were played at Tualatin Hills Park & Recreation District's Howard M. Terpenning Complex.

Average attendance

External links
 Portland Rain page
 Portland Rain Soccer City USA

References

Women's Premier Soccer League teams
Women's soccer clubs in the United States
2008 establishments in Oregon
Association football clubs established in 2008
Rain
Defunct soccer clubs in Oregon
2012 disestablishments in Oregon